Forsteronia pycnothyrsus is a species of plant in the family Apocynaceae. It is endemic to Ecuador.

References

pycnothyrsus
Endemic flora of Ecuador
Data deficient plants
Taxonomy articles created by Polbot